Crack-Up can refer to:

 The Crack-Up, a 1945 collection of essays by F. Scott Fitzgerald
 Crack-Up (1936 film), an American movie
 Crack-Up (1946 film), an American movie
 Crack-Up (album), 2017 album by Fleet Foxes